NGC 5714 is a spiral galaxy located 130 million light-years away in the constellation of Boötes (the Herdsman). It was discovered by William Herschel in 1787.
This galaxy is about 130 million light-years away.

References

External links

NGC 5714 on SIMBAD

5714
Boötes
Spiral galaxies
Discoveries by William Herschel